Rokhaya Niang, is a Sénégalese actress. She is best known for her critically acclaimed roles in the films Le prix du pardon, L'Extraordinaire destin de Madame Brouette and Teranga Blues.

Career
In 2001, Niang started her debut cinema acting with the film Le prix du pardon directed by Mansour Sora Wade. With the success of the film, she was selected for the film L'Extraordinaire destin de Madame Brouette in 2002. Both films were selected for the Panafrican Film and Television Festival of Ouagadougou (FESPACO) in 2003. However, her mos popular cinema acting came through the 2007 feature film Teranga Blues directed by Moussa Sène Absa when she played the role of 'Rokhaya'.

Filmography

References

External links
 

Living people
Senegalese film actresses
Year of birth missing (living people)